Renovascular hypertension is a condition in which high blood pressure is caused by the kidneys' hormonal response to narrowing of the arteries supplying the kidneys. When functioning properly this hormonal axis regulates blood pressure. Due to low local blood flow, the kidneys mistakenly increase blood pressure of the entire circulatory system. It is a form of secondary hypertension - a form of hypertension whose cause is identifiable.

Signs and symptoms

Symptoms of renovascular hypertension include the following:
 High blood pressure (early age)
 Kidney dysfunction
 Narrowing of arteries elsewhere in the body
 Pulmonary edema

Cause
The cause of renovascular hypertension is consistent with any narrowing/blockage of blood supply to the renal organ (renal artery stenosis). As a consequence of this action the renal organs release hormones that indicate to the body to maintain a higher amount of sodium and water, which in turn causes blood pressure to rise. Factors that may contribute are: diabetes, high cholesterol and advanced age, also of importance is that a unilateral
condition is sufficient to cause renovascular hypertension.

Pathogenesis

The pathogenesis of renovascular hypertension involves the narrowing of the arteries supplying the kidneys which causes a low perfusion pressure that is detected by the juxtaglomerular apparatus (via the macula densa cells, which act as baroreceptors; located on the afferent arteriole wall). This leads to renin secretion that causes the angiotensinogen conversion to angiotensin I. Angiotensin I then proceeds to the lung where it is converted to angiotensin II via angiotensin converting enzyme (ACE).

In most people fibromuscular dysplasia or atherosclerosis is the reason for the occlusion of a renal artery which ultimately leads to this condition.

Diagnosis
The diagnosis for renovascular hypertension is done by:
 Blood test (for renal function)
 Urinary test (tests for microalbuminuria)
 Serology (to exclude systemic lupus erythematosus )
 Lipid profile
 Urinalysis (to exclude presence of red blood cells)

Treatment
In terms of treatment for renovascular hypertension surgical revascularization versus medical therapy for atherosclerosis, it is not clear if one option is better than the other according to a 2014 Cochrane review; balloon angioplasty did show a small improvement in blood pressure .

Surgery can include percutaneous surgical revascularization, and also nephrectomy or autotransplantation, and the individual may be given beta-adrenergic blockers. Early therapeutic intervention is important if ischemic nephropathy is to be prevented. Inpatient care is necessary for the management of hypertensive urgencies, quick intervention is required to prevent further damage to the kidneys.

Prognosis
The prognosis of individuals with renovascular hypertension is not easy to determine. Those with atherosclerotic renal artery disease have a high risk of mortality, furthermore, those who also have renal dysfunction have a higher mortality risk.
However, the majority of renovascular diseases can be improved with surgery.

See also
 Fibromuscular dysplasia
 Hypertensive nephropathy
 Kidney failure
 Renal artery stenosis

References

Further reading

External links 

Nephrology
Hypertension